Fairchild Recording Equipment Corporation was an American manufacturer of professional audio equipment located in Whitestone, New York.

Background
The company was founded by Sherman Fairchild in 1931 to augment his interests in photography and image projection.

Fairchild's most notable products were the Fairchild 670 stereo compressor and its mono sibling, the Fairchild 660. These compressors can sell for over $30,000 . The original design, created by Rein Narma as he was building Les Paul's first 8-channel mixing console, was licensed by Sherman Fairchild who hired Rein Narma as the company's chief engineer.

The company's products also included amplifiers, preamplifiers, a control track generator to synchronize tape recorders, and recording lathes.

References

External links 
 Fairchild Audio (private Hifi Classic Project)

Manufacturers of professional audio equipment
Audio equipment manufacturers of the United States
Manufacturing companies based in New York (state)
American companies established in 1931
Electronics companies established in 1931
Manufacturing companies established in 1931
1931 establishments in New York City